Sidney Chapman Wagner (January 13, 1901 – April 7, 1947) was an American cinematographer. He was nominated for two Academy Awards in the category Best Cinematography for the films Northwest Passage and Dragon Seed. Wagner died in April 1947, after he felt ill, in Hollywood, California, at the age of 47. He was buried in Forest Lawn Memorial Park.

Selected filmography 
 Northwest Passage (1940; co-nominated with William V. Skall)
 Dragon Seed (1944)
 The Postman Always Rings Twice (1946)

References

External links 

1901 births
1947 deaths
People from Los Angeles
American cinematographers
Burials at Forest Lawn Memorial Park (Hollywood Hills)